The 2011–12 Liga Nacional Superior de Voleibol Femenino is the 8th official season of the Peruvian Volleyball League, the first round started November 16, 2011 and will conclude January 22, 2012 and consists of a single Round-Robyn system where all 12 teams will play once against the other 11. Due to the preparation of some of the players for the 2012 Summer Olympics, this round served as the "Apertura" round.

Competing teams

  Alianza Lima (ALI)
  Universidad César Vallejo (UCV)
  Circolo Sportivo Italiano(CSI)
  Deportivo Alianza (DAL)
  Géminis(GEM)
  Divino Maestro (CDM)
  Latino Amisa (LAT)
  Regatas Lima (CRL)
  Universidad San Martín (USM)
  Sporting Cristal (SCR)
  Túpac Amaru (TUP)
  Wanka Surco(WKA)

Final standing procedure

 Match points
 Numbers of matches won
 Sets ratio
 Points ratio

Match won 3–0 or 3–1: 3 match points for the winner, 0 match points for the loser
Match won 3–2: 2 match points for the winner, 1 match point for the loser

Final standings

Matches

First Round, November 16 - December 20, 2011
The first round consisted of 40 matches, with an average of six matches per week. Teams played seven matches during this round except for four teams that only played six.

Second Round, January 6–22, 2012
The second round will see the 26 remaining matches, with an average of seven matches per week.

References

Volleyball competitions in Peru
2011 in Peruvian sport
2012 in Peruvian sport